Bullarium is a term commonly applied to a collection of papal bulls and other analogous documents, whether the scope of the collection be general in character, or limited to the bulls connected to any particular order, or institution, or locality.

Origins
The name bullarium seems to have been invented by the canonist Laertius Cherobini who in 1586 published under the title "Bullarium, sive Collectio diversarum Constitutionum multorum Pontificum". It was a large folio volume of 1404 pages containing 922 papal constitutions from Gregory VII down to Sixtus V, the pope then reigning.

With regard to this and all subsequent collections, three things have carefully to be borne in mind. First, whatever may have been the intrinsic importance or binding force of any of the bulls so published, the selection itself was a matter that depended entirely upon the arbitrary choice of the various editors. As a collection the publication had no official character. The only recognized exception to this assertion is the first volume of a collection of his own bulls which was sent by Benedict XIV in 1746 to the University of Bologna to serve as a fons iuris, or source of legal principles. Secondly, it was never seriously maintained, despite some pretentious title pages, that these collections were in any sense complete, or that they even contained all the constitutions of more general interest. Thirdly, it was the intention of the editors, at least at first, rather to exclude than to include the papal pronouncements which had already been incorporated into the text of canon law. The avowed object of the early collections was to render assistance to canonists by bringing within their reach papal enactments which either had been overlooked by the compilers of the "corpus" or which had been issued subsequently to the latest decrees included in it.

Various collections of relatively recent papal constitutions were published in the early part of the sixteenth century. A typical specimen of such booklets is supplied by a rare little volume of sixty-two pages printed at Rome per Stephanum Guillereti in regione Parionis 1509, a copy of which is in the British Museum Library. A contribution of more substantial volume appears to have been a volume edited by Mazzutellus in 1579 which contained 723 documents. But it is to Laertius Cherubini that the credit is usually given of creating the bullarium in substance as well as in name. In the preface to the volume of which the title has already been given, the editor refers to his experiences in the ecclesiastical courts of Rome. In these courts I have noticed (he says) that certain advocates and judges went completely astray because they had not at hand the text of those apostolic constitutions a knowledge of which is most necessary in treating and pronouncing upon causes, seeing that in such constitutions is embodied the whole of the most recent pontifical law.

After this explanation it is not surprising to find that out of Cherubini's 922 documents more than 800 were of recent date, that is to say they belonged to the hundred years immediately preceding the appearance of the volume. Of this collection, a second edition in three volumes, was printed at Rome in 1617, and a third edition in four volumes extending in this case from Leo I to Urban VIII, was prepared by the editor's son, Angelo Cherubini, in 1638, with a supplement added in 1659. Other editions followed, always somewhat enlarged. The fifth in six volumes was brought out by two Franciscans at Rome, 1669–72.

The Luxembourg Bullarium
Moreover, a fuller but not more accurate reprint with supplementary volumes appeared in the eighteenth century, nominally at Luxembourg, although the actual place of impression is said to have been Geneva. Of this edition, which is one of the most commonly met with in libraries, the first eight volumes coming down to Benedict XVIII all bear the date 1727, while a ninth and tenth volume, supplementing the earlier portion, appeared in 1730. Other supplements followed at intervals. Four volumes were published in 1741 covering respectively the periods 1670–89, 1689–1721, 1721–30, 1730–40. In the same series, and still later, we have the following volumes: XV (1748), extending over 1734–40; XVI (1752) 1740–45; XVII (1753), 1746–49; XVIII (1754), 1748–52; XIX (1758), 1752–57. The last four volumes are entirely taken up with the Bulls of Benedict XIV.

This Luxembourg edition appears to have been in part the source of the great confusion which is to be found in many accounts of the subject, notably in the article "Bullaire" in the Dictionnaire de theologie catholique. It is not quite true, as has sometimes been supposed, that the "Luxembourg" editors contributed nothing of their own to the collection. For example, in Vol. IX (1730) we have two bulls of the English pope, Adrian IV, printed from the originals at Geneva with engraved facsimiles of the rota and the leaden bulla, and in fact the whole of the content of Vols. IX and X represent a large measure of independent research. The later volumes of the series, however, have simply been copied from the Roman edition next to be mentioned.

Mainardi's Roman Bullarium
This Roman edition of the bullarium, which still remains the most accurate and practically useful, bears on the title pages of its thirty-two volumes, the name of the publisher, Girolamo Mainardi, while the dedications to the cardinals prefixed to the different volumes and extending from 1733 to 1762 are also signed by him. The arrangement of the volumes, however, is peculiar, and the neglect to indicate these peculiarities has made the accounts given to this edition in most bibliographies almost unintelligible. Mainardi began with the idea of printing a supplement to the latest Roman edition of Cherubini's bullarium. As this was six volumes and stopped short at the pontificate of Clement X (1670–76), Mainardi called his first published volume Tome VII, and reprinted the bulls of Clement X from the beginning of his pontificate to his death. Moreover, an engraved frontispiece prefixed to this volume, printed in 1733, bears the words "Bullarium Romanum Tom. VII." The book further contains a promise that the six volumes of Cherubini's bullarium should in the course of time be reprinted in a corrected and enlarged form, with the aid of the documents contained in the secret archives of the Holy See. Seven other volumes followed in sequence to this first. They were printed from 1734 to 1744 and brought the collection from Clement X in 1670 to the accession of Benedict XIV in 1740.

Meanwhile, the publisher had engaged an able scholar, Charles Cocquelines, to re-edit the six volumes of Cherubini's bullarium from Leo I to Clement X. In his hands an immense mass of material accumulated. The first volume was printed in 1739 and it bore a slightly different title from that of the installment which Mainardi had already published, beginning at "Tom VII." Cocquelines' section was headed "Bullarium privilegarium ac diplomatum Romanorum Pontificum amplissima collectio" and in comparison with Cherubini's meager gleanings from antiquity the epithet amplissima was fully deserved. This series, like all good work, advanced very slowly. A tabular arrangement will best show the details. The editor had to make his numbering correspond with Cherubini's six volumes and consequently some of the nominal tomi of the new edition were divided into several parts.

Some time before the compilation of this series, Cocquelines had died, and the last five volumes to appear did not bear his name. Simultaneously with this amplified edition of Cherubini, Mainardi had also been publishing, in folio, but somewhat smaller, the four volumes of the bullarium of Benedict XIV, the first of which, as already noted, appeared with that pontiff's own authentication. In sum, the whole collection which issued from Mainardi's press amounted to thirty-two folio volumes and extended from Leo I in 450 to the death of Benedict XIV, 1758. As this in time grew antiquated, Andrew Barberi began in 1835 the publication of the Bulls of Pope Clement XIII and his successors "Bullarii Romani Continuato" (19 volumes, fol.), Rome, 1835–57. These came down to the fourth year of Gregory XVI, i.e. to 1834. There is also another series of the same kind which appeared as a continuation of the Bullarium of Benedict XIV at Prato in 1843–67 (10 vols., folio).

The Turin Bullarium
Finally, a large quarto edition of the bullarium was begun at Turin under the auspices of Cardinal Gaudi in 1857, edited by Tomasetti. It claims to be more comprehensive, better printed, and better arranged than the work of Cocquelines, but the additions made are insignificant and the typographical errors are numerous. Moreover, among the documents added, especially in Appendix I (1867), are included some whose authenticity is more than doubtful. At Turin, twenty-two volumes were printed (1857–72) down to Clement XII and five more, continuing the work to the end of Benedict XIV, were added at Naples (1867–85).

Particular Bullaria
Bullaria have been compiled collecting the papal documents relating to a religious order, institution or locality. For example, eight volumes have recently been published by R. de Martinis under the title "Jus Pontificium de Propaganda Fide" (Rome, 1888–98). This is in substance the bullarium of the Congregation of Propaganda brought up to date. Similarly, an exhaustive collection or rather calendar of early papal documents concerning the churches of Italy has been undertaken by P. F. Kehr under the title "Italia Pontificia" (Berlin 1906). The expense is defrayed by the Gottinger Academy. Of the more important religious orders, nearly all have at some time or other collected their privileges in print. Among the most extensive of such compilations, which formerly often went by the name "Mare Magnum" (the Great Ocean) may be mentioned the Bullarium of the Dominicans, edited by Ripoll and Brémond (eight vols., Rome, 1729–40); that of the Franciscans, edited by Sbaralea (4 vols., Rome, 1758–80), with a more modern continuation by Eubel, (3 vols., Rome, 1897–1904); that of the Capuchins (7 vols., Rome, 1740–52); that of the Benedictines of Monte Cassino (2 vols., Venice, 1650). All the volumes mentioned here were folios, mostly of considerable bulk.

Historically speaking, the most interesting papal volumes are often those contained in the "Regesta" which have never been included in the general Bullarium. Since the archives of the Vatican were thrown open to students by Leo XIII in 1883, immense labor has been spent upon the copying and publication of the Bulls contained in the "Regesta." but even before this date, facilities for research were not infrequently accorded. Many hundreds of copies of documents relating to Great Britain were made for the British Government by Marino de Marinis in the early part of the nineteenth century and are now preserved in the British Museum.

In 1873 the Reverend Joseph Stevenson was sent to Rome for a similar purpose and transcripts made by him during four years' residence may be consulted at the Record Office, London. Since then, Messrs Bliss and Tenlow have been engaged in the same task and have published at the expense of the British Government seven volumes of a "Calendar of Entries in the Papal Register illustrating the History of Great Britain and Ireland." These are primarily papal letters, and they extend from the beginning of the thirteenth to the middle of the fifteenth century. The members of the Ecole Française de Rome have been equally active, with the publication of the "regesta" of various pontificates, mostly of the thirteenth century. Those of
 Honorius IV (1285–87),
 Nicolaus IV (1288–92),
 Benedict XI (1304–04)
have been published and are complete. Those of
 Innocent IV (1243–54),
 Urban IV (1261–64),
 Clement VI (1265–68)
are all but complete; while great progress has been made with those of
 Gregory X and John XXI (1271–77),
 Nicolaus III (1271–80),
 Martin IV (1281–85),
 Boniface VIII (1291–03),
 Gregory IX (1227–41), and
 Alexander IV (1254–61).

Besides these, the "Regesta" of Clement V (1305–1314) have been published by the Benedictines in nine volumes folio at the cost of Leo XIII, and those of John XXII (1316–34), as far as they relate to France, are being printed by A. Coulon, while those of the other Avignon popes are also in hand. The Regesta of Innocent III and his successor Honorius III have long been printed, and they are among the last volumes printed in the Patrology of Migne. Finally among local bullaria we may mentioned the considerable collections published some time ago by Augustin Theiner for various countries under the general heading of "Vetera Monumenta."

With regard to the early centuries, where no originals of official copies exist to which we can make appeal, the task of distinguishing genuine from spurious papal letters becomes exceedingly delicate. The collection of Dom Coustant, "Epistolae Romanorum Pontificorum" (Paris, 1721), is of the highest value, but the compiler only lived to carry his work down to the year 440, and A. Thiele, who continued it, brought it no further than 553. Some further help has been provided by Hampe, regarding the papal letters to Charlemagne and to Louis the Pious, and by Herth-Gerenth for Sergius II. For practical purposes the chief court of appeal for an opinion on all papal documents is the "Regesta Pontificorum Romanorum" of Philipp Jaffé, much improved in its second edition by its editors, Wattenbach, Ewald, Kalterbrunner, and Löwenfeld. In this a brief synopsis of given of all existing papal documents known to be in existence, from the time of Peter to that of Innocent III (1198), with indications of the collections in which they have been printed and with an appendix dealing with spurious documents. This has been continued by August Potthast to the year 1304 (2 vols., Berlin).

It may be added that compendiums have also been published of the "Bullarium Romanum" as printed in the eighteenth century. Of these the most valuable is probably that of Guerra "Pontificarium Constitutionem in Bullario Magno contentarum Epitome" (4 vols., Venice, 1772), which possesses a very complete and useful index. Commentaries on the bullarium or on large portions of it have been published by the Jesuit J. B. Scortia (Lyons, 1625), by the Dominican, M. de Gregorio (Naples, 1648), and by Cardinal Vincent Petra (Rome, 1705–26). Finally, attention may be called to the bulls contained in volume edited by Galante, "Fontes Juris Canonici" (Innsbruck, 1906).

References

External links
 Cherubini Laertius: Magnum Bullarium Romanum*